Çärjew District (formerly Türkmenabat/Serdarabat District) is a district of Lebap Province in Turkmenistan. The administrative center of the district is the town of Türkmenabat.

References

Districts of Turkmenistan
Lebap Region